This is an incomplete alphabetical list of mining companies.

A
 Adex Mining
 Aditya Birla Group
 African Rainbow Minerals
 Agnico Eagle
 Aiteo
 Alumina
 Anaconda Copper
 Anglo American (mining)
 Anglo Platinum
 AngloGold Ashanti
 Antofagasta
 Aricom
 Arctic Canadian Diamond Company
 Astra Resources
 Atalaya Mining Minas de Riotinto
 Aurubis
 Avalon Rare Metals

B
 Bard Ventures Company
 Barrick Gold
 BHP
 Blaafarveværket
 Blackfire Exploration
 Boliden
 Bougainville Copper
 Breakwater Resources

C
 Cambior
 Candente Copper
 Canico Resource
 Cape Breton Development Corporation
 Chinalco
 China Molybdenum
 Cleveland-Cliffs
 CNK International
 Coal & Allied
 Coal India
 Codelco
 Colorado Fuel & Iron
 Compass Minerals
 Compass Resources
 Consolidated Zinc
 Cordero Mining Company
 Crowflight Minerals
 Companhia Siderúrgica Nacional
 Cuniptau Mines
 Cuprom
 Cyprus Mines Corporation

D
 De Beers
 Debswana
 Doe Run Company
 Drummond Company
 Dundee Corporation

E 
 Echo Bay Mines
 Eldorado Gold
 Eldorado Resources
 Empire Zinc Company
 Energy Resources of Australia

F
 Falconbridge
 First Quantum Minerals
 FNX Mining
 Fortescue Metals Group
 Freeport-McMoRan

G
 Gécamines
 Glamis Gold
 Glencore
 Gogebic Taconite
 Gold Fields
 Gold Reserve
 Goldcorp
 Growmax Resources
 Grupo México

H
 Harmony Gold
 Hearst, Haggin, Tevis and Co.
 Hillsborough Resources
 Hindustan Zinc
 Hochschild Mining
 Hollinger Mines

I
 International Coal Group
 Iron Ore Company of Canada

K
 Kazakhmys
 Kenmare Resources
 Kennecott Utah Copper
 KGHM Polska Miedz
 Kinross Gold
 Korea General Magnesia Clinker Industry Group
 Korea General Zinc Industry Group

L
 LKAB
 Lonmin
 Lucara Diamond
 Lundin Mining
 Luzenac Group

M
 Maaden
 Martin Marietta Materials
 Massey Energy
 Metallica Resources
 Minera Escondida
 Mineral Resources
 MMG
 Mond Nickel Company
 Mosaic
 Mount Lyell Mining & Railway Company
 MSPL

N
 NERCO
 Nevsun Resources
 New Hope Coal
 New Jersey Zinc Company
 Newcrest
 Newmont
 Nirex
 Noranda
 Nordic Mining
 North American Palladium
 North Limited
 Northern Star Resources
 NovaGold Resources

O
 Orex Exploration
 Outokumpu

P
 Pacific Coast Borax Company
 Palabora Mining Company
 Pan American Silver Corporation
 Pasminco
 Peko-Wallsend
 Peter Hambro Mining
 Petra Diamonds
 Phelps Dodge
 Pilbara Iron
 Polymetal
 Polyus Gold
 PotashCorp

Q
 QCoal
 QIT-Fer et Titane
 QIT Madagascar Minerals

R
 Reading Anthracite Company
 Rio Tinto
 Rio Tinto Coal Australia
 Rockwell Diamonds

S
 Saskatchewan Minerals
 Semafo
 Sesa Goa
 Sherritt International
 Sibanye Gold
 Siberian Business Union
 Sifto Canada
 Silver Standard Resources
 Silver Wheaton
 Silvercorp Metals
 Soma Kömür İşletmeleri A.Ş.
 South32
 South American Silver Corporation
 Store Norske Spitsbergen Kulkompani

T
 Teck Cominco
 Thompson Creek Metals
 Titanium Resources Group
 Tiwest Joint Venture

U
 UK Coal

V
 Vale
 Vale Inco
 Vedanta Resources
 Victor-American Fuel Company
 Vulcan Materials Company

W
Walter Energy

X
 Xstrata

Y
 Yamana Gold
 Yancoal

Z
 Zinifex

 
Lists of companies by industry
Companies